John J. Leary (July, 1857 – December 6, 1905) was an American Major League Baseball player, who played for seven different teams during his five-year career.  Jack died at the age of 48 in his hometown of New Haven, Connecticut.

References

External links

1857 births
1905 deaths
Baseball players from New Haven, Connecticut
Major League Baseball pitchers
Major League Baseball outfielders
Major League Baseball shortstops
Major League Baseball third basemen
Boston Red Caps players
Detroit Wolverines players
Baltimore Orioles (AA) players
Louisville Eclipse players
Altoona Mountain Citys players
Pittsburgh Alleghenys players
Chicago Browns/Pittsburgh Stogies players
19th-century baseball players
Erie (minor league baseball) players
Lynn Live Oaks players
Manchester (minor league baseball) players
San Francisco Bay City players
New York New Yorks players
New York Metropolitans (minor league) players
Washington Nationals (minor league) players
Albany (minor league baseball) players
Harrisburg (minor league baseball) players
Terre Haute (minor league baseball) players
Augusta Browns players
Bridgeport Giants players
New Haven Blues players